A hinge is a mechanical bearing that connects two solid objects.

Hinge or hinges can also refer to:

Arts, entertainment, and media
 Hinge, former name of the band Dry Kill Logic
 "Hinge I" and "Hinge II", tracks on If You Saw Thro' My Eyes album by Iain Matthews

Science and mathematics
 Hinge joint (ginglymus), a bone joint 
 Hinge line of bivalve shells
 Hinge teeth of bivalve shells
 Ligament (bivalve) or hinge ligament of a bivalve shell
 Molecular hinge, a molecule that can be selectively switched from one configuration to another in a reversible fashion
 Hinge functions in multivariate statistics
 Hinge theorem in geometry

People
 See Hinge (surname)
 Hinge and Bracket, stage personae

Places
 Hinges, Pas-de-Calais, a place in France

Types of hinge
 Floating hinge, a type of hinge that enables one of the objects to move away from the other 
 Geared continuous hinge, a type of continuous hinge
 Living hinge, a thin flexible hinge made from the same material as the two rigid pieces it connects
 Plastic hinge in structural engineering beam theory
 Stamp hinge in philately

Other uses
 Hinge (app), a dating app
 Hinge Studios in California
 Jonbar hinge in science-fiction criticism

See also
 Hing (disambiguation)
 Unhinged (disambiguation)
 Hinge loss in machine learning
 Hinge pearl, a type of imitation pearl
 Hinge-action, or break-action, in firearms
 Hell's Hinges, silent film
 The Crooked Hinge, novel
 Pressure the Hinges, album by Haste the Day
 Kinixys, genus of hinge-back tortoises